Uintaceras is an extinct genus of medium-sized rhinoceros that lived in North America (Wyoming and Utah) during the Middle Eocene, with only the type species U. radinskyi, named in 1997, currently contained within the genus. Uintaceras is the oldest and most primitive species of the Rhinocerotidae known to date, although it may have belonged to its own, currently unknown, separate family. The dubious species Forstercooperia (Hyrachyus) grandis (Radinsky, 1967; Peterson, 1919) is also possibly the same animal as Uintaceras, although the Asian material of F. grandis was assignable to Forstercooperia confluens.

Uintaceras weighed about  when fully grown. It was a relatively slender animal and Uintaceras resembled a typical hyracodontid (e.g. Hyracodon), but differed from the hyracodonts due to the presence of a primitive four-fingered hand and a number of other features of the structure of the legs, which were clearly not intended for fast and long running.

References 

Prehistoric mammals of North America
Paleontology in Utah
Paleontology in Wyoming
Eocene rhinoceroses
Fossil taxa described in 1997
Prehistoric mammals